Allée de la Tour–Rendez-Vous is a railway station on the Île-de-France tramway Line 4 in the commune of Villemomble.

External links
 

Railway stations in France opened in 1875
Tramways in Île-de-France
Railway stations in Seine-Saint-Denis